Friedrich Wilhelm of Limburg-Styrum, (July 1649 – July 1722) count of Limburg and Bronckhorst was the son of Otto of Limburg-Styrum.

He married in 1683 Lucia d'Aylva and they had seven children: (possibly)

Otto II of Limburg, count of Limburg and Bronckhorst (1685–1769), father of:
 Friedrich Wilhelm (1723–1747). His great-great-grandson was Friedrich zu Limburg-Stirum.
 Albert Dominicus (1725–1776), father of:
 Leopold Karel, Count of Limburg Stirum;
 Samuel Johann (1754–1824), father of:
 Wilhelm Bernard (1795–1889). His great-grandson was Charles of Limburg Stirum.
 Otto Leopold (1801–1879). His grandson was Johan Paul van Limburg Stirum.
Albert Dominicus of Limburg and Bronckhorst  (1686 – 1704, in Porrtugal);
Friedrich Heinrich of Limburg and Bronckhorst (1689–1740);
Leopold of Limburg and Bronckhorst (1694–1728), who married in 1722 Helene de Haze (1681–1753);
Maria Anna of Limburg and Bronckhorst (1688–1759);
Sophie Charlotte (1690–1729). She married in 1727 Jan Karel van Lynden d'Aspremont (died 1728); and
Eleonore, (1697–1769).

References
 Die Grafen von Limburg Stirum: Einleitung und abschliessender Band der Geschichte der Grafen Van Limburg Stirum und ihrer direkten Vorfahren; Günter Aders, J. P. J. Gewin; Van Gorcum, 1962

House of Limburg-Stirum
Counts of Germany
1724 deaths
1649 births